The 2015–16 Campeonato Nacional season was the 85th season of top-flight football in Chile. Cobresal was the defending champion.

Format changes
Same as last season: Apertura and Clausura format, without playoffs.

Teams

Stadia and locations

Personnel and kits

Torneo Apertura

Standings

Apertura Liguilla
Winner qualified for 2016 Copa Sudamericana first stage (Chile 1).

Torneo Clausura

Standings

Clausura Liguilla
Winner qualify for 2016 Copa Sudamericana first stage (Chile 2).

Aggregate table

See also
 2015–16 Primera B de Chile
 2015–16 Segunda División Profesional de Chile

References

External links
ANFP 

2015–16 Campeonato Nacional season
2015–16 in Chilean football
2015 in South American football leagues
Primera División de Chile seasons